Just Married (Italian: Oggi sposi) is a 1934 Italian comedy film directed by Guido Brignone and starring Umberto Melnati, Leda Gloria and Ugo Ceseri.

The film's sets were designed by the art director Guido Fiorini. It was shot at the Cines Studios in Rome.

Synopsis
A newly-married couple from a small town near Como take advantage of a government policy offering new couples a honeymoon in the capital Rome. They enjoy a series of misadventures, and struggle to understand the ways of the city's inhabitants. In one of the most celebrated scenes they win a thoroughbred racehorse which they then have to navigate through the city's traffic.

Cast
 Umberto Melnati as Renzo 
 Leda Gloria as Lucia 
 Ugo Ceseri
 Giuseppe Porelli
 Marcella Melnati
 Mario Gallina
 Gino Viotti
 Ada Dondini

References

Bibliography
 Roberto Chiti & Roberto Poppi. I film: Tutti i film italiani dal 1930 al 1944. Gremese Editore, 2005.
 Mancini, Elaine. Struggles of the Italian film industry during fascism, 1930-1935. UMI Research Press, 1985.

External links

1934 films
Italian comedy films
Italian black-and-white films
1934 comedy films
1930s Italian-language films
Films directed by Guido Brignone
Films set in Rome
Cines Studios films
1930s Italian films